Ruiz-Mateos, el primer fenómeno viral is a four-part streaming television docuseries directed by Roger Gual focusing on the figure of Spanish businessman José María Ruiz-Mateos. It was released on RTVE Play on 27 October 2021.

Premise 
A winemaking businessman from Jerez de la Frontera with connections to the Opus Dei thriving in the years of the Transition, José María Ruiz-Mateos was the founder of Rumasa, which became a holding of hundreds of companies employing a considerable workforce and constituting a 2% share of the Spanish GDP in the early 1980s. Investigated due to banking irregularities, the whole holding (which turned out to be financially unsustainable) was expropiated outright in 1983 on the basis of massive tax avoidance and the impending bankruptcy. From then on, Ruiz Mateos launched an all-out propaganda war against the Government of Spain in order to keep the public attention (a media circus consisting of stagings such as threatening politicians, punching the finance minister Miguel Boyer, dressing up as Superman or asking one of his many daughters to throw a cake to Isabel Preysler). After fleeing from justice twice, he served as member of the European Parliament from 1989 to 1994. He also put his wife, at the helm of Rayo Vallecano. Eventually, he got to rebuild a new holding, which committed fraud in 2011, scamming millions of euros to small investors in a large-scale pyramid scheme.

Ruiz Mateos is thus portrayed throughout the series as an early case of viral phenomenon predating the popularization of social media.

Production 
Besides footage from archives, the documentary features interviews to close acquaintances and collaborators of Ruiz Mateos, journalists, and victims of his scams, as well as politicians such as government spokesperson Eduardo Sotillos or minister Carlos Solchaga.

The musical score include songs by Ladilla Rusa, Los Punsetes and Astrud.

Release 
The full docuseries was released on RTVE Play on 27 October 2021.

References

External links 
 Ruiz-Mateos, el primer fenómeno viral on RTVE Play

Spanish documentary television series
2021 Spanish television series debuts
2021 Spanish television series endings
2020s documentary television series
Spanish-language television shows
RTVE Play original programming